Kamuela C. Searle (August 29, 1890 – February 14, 1924) was an actor, sculptor, and painter, best remembered for his portrayal of Korak, the son of Tarzan and Jane.

Early life and film career
Born as Samuel Cooper Searle in Wai’ohinu, Ka’u, Hawai’i, Searle met legendary film director Cecil B. DeMille on the beach at Waikiki in 1915. DeMille encouraged Searle to go to Hollywood and pursue a film career. Legend has it that Searle appeared in a couple of DeMille's films during this time, but no definite proof exists. He enlisted in the United States Army during World War I, and fought and was wounded in France. Upon his discharge, Searle adopted Kamuela (the Hawaiian spelling of Samuel) as his first name, and appeared, uncredited, in DeMille's 1919 film Male and Female. His first credited role was in The Island of Desire, as Sam Searles, released in 1917.

Korak and beyond
Cowboy actor Jack Hoxie was originally slated to play the adult Jack Clayton (known by the Ape name Korak) in the 1920 film serial The Son of Tarzan, but was dropped from the production before filming began. Searle was cast, and enthusiastically spent a month in the desert to "harden" himself for the role.  Searle also played a supporting role in that same year in The Sea Wolf, based on the Jack London novel and starring Noah Beery in the titular role.

Death urban legend and final years
Many sources, including Gabe Essoe's Tarzan of the Movies, have incorrectly stated that Searle was mortally wounded when an elephant carrying him bound to a stake slammed him to the ground. Though he was hurt enough that a double completed a few final long shots, Searle recovered from his injuries and completed one more film, Cecil B. DeMille's Fool's Paradise (1921), before he retired from acting to concentrate on sculpting and painting.

According to Kamuela Searle's brother, he died of cancer in 1924, aged 33.

References

Essoe, Gabe. Tarzan of The Movies, 1968. Published by The Citadel Press,

External links

 

American male silent film actors
1890 births
1924 deaths
Deaths from cancer in California
20th-century American male actors
Male actors from Hawaii